The 2010–11 season was Panathinaikos' 52nd consecutive season in Super League Greece.

They also competed in the Greek Cup and the UEFA Champions League

Current squad 

As of 8 February 2011

Transfers

In

Out

Out on loan

Competitions

Super League Greece

Regular season

League table

Matches

UEFA play-offs

League table

Matches

Greek Cup

Fourth round

Fifth round

Quarter-finals

UEFA Champions League

Group D

Top goalscorers
Including matches played on 25 May 2011; Source: Soccerway
26 goals
  Djibril Cissé (20 in Super League, 4 in play-offs, 2 in Greek Cup)7 goals
  Lazaros Christodoulopoulos (5 in Super League, 2 in Greek Cup)6 goals
  Kostas Katsouranis (5 in Super League, 1 in play-offs)4 goals
  Sotiris Ninis (3 in Super League, 1 in Greek Cup)  Antonis Petropoulos (4 in Super League)  Loukas Vyntra (2 in Super League, 2 in Greek Cup)3 goals
  Gilberto Silva (1 in Super League, 1 in play-offs, 1 in Greek Cup)  Sidney Govou (1 in Super League, 1 in Greek Cup, 1 in Champions League)  Sebastián Leto (1 in Super League, 1 in play-offs, 1 in Greek Cup)2 goals
  Cédric Kanté (1 in Super League, 1 in Champions League)  Luis García (1 in Super League, 1 in play-offs)1 goal
   Jean-Alain Boumsong (1 in Super League)  Josu Sarriegi (1 in Greek Cup)  Nikos Spiropoulos (1 in Super League)Own goals
   Ismael Blanco (AEK)   Christos Pipinis (Asteras Tripolis)''

References

External links
 Panathinaikos FC official website

Panathinaikos
Panathinaikos F.C. seasons
Panathinaikos